Telehack is an online simulation of a stylized interface for ARPANET and Usenet, created anonymously in 2010. It is a full multi-user simulation, including 26,600+ simulated hosts with files spanning the years 1985 to 1990.

Users can explore a pre-Web 1.0 archive of files, documents, scripts and newsgroup posts saved from BBSes thanks to textfiles.com.

References

External links 

 Telehack

Hacking (computer security)
Simulation video games